Fontanil-Cornillon is a commune in the Isère department in southeastern France. It is part of the Grenoble urban unit (agglomeration).

Population

Twin towns
Fontanil-Cornillon is twinned with:

  Ponchatoula, Louisiana, United States, since 1987
  Monte Roberto, Italy, since 1992
  Saint-Joseph-du-Lac, Quebec, Canada, since 2008

See also
Communes of the Isère department

References

Communes of Isère
Isère communes articles needing translation from French Wikipedia